Aureocramboides is a genus of moths of the family Crambidae.

Species
Aureocramboides apollo Bleszynski, 1961
Aureocramboides mopsos Bassi, 1991

References

Crambinae
Crambidae genera
Taxa named by Stanisław Błeszyński